The active natural hormonal form of vitamin D is 1,25-dihydroxyvitamin D (1,25(OH)2D). This molecule and other naturally occurring forms of vitamin D, including its precursors and metabolites, have been modified to synthesize pharmaceuticals with potentially greater, or selective, therapeutic actions.

Types
These include:
 Alfacalcidol
 Calcipotriol (calcipotriene)
 Doxercalciferol
 Falecalcitriol
 Paricalcitol
 Tacalcitol

Mechanisms
These modified vitamin D analogues have side chain or other modifications. They aim to reduce the classical renal and intestinal effects of calcitriol on calcium and phosphate homeostasis, from its effects on other biologic processes. They target cell proliferation and differentiation, especially in skin, or other effects in the parathyroid gland (secondary hyperparathyroidism) or bone cells.

References

Drugs
Vitamin D